Minor Mappillai is a 1996 Indian Tamil-language comedy film directed by V. C. Guhanathan. The film stars Ajith Kumar, Ranjith, newcomer Rajkumar, Subhashri and Keerthana, while Srividya, Vadivelu and Vivek appeared in supporting roles. It was released on 28 June 1996. The film was a remake of director's own Telugu film Paruvu Prathishta (1993).

Plot
Ramu (Ajith Kumar) and Moses (Ranjith) are orphans and small-time crooks. They make a living by cheating people with the help of their sidekicks. One day, they even clashed with the drug smuggler "Challenge" Sankaralingam (Ajay Rathnam). Meanwhile, the college students Dilip (Rajkumar) and Rekha (Subhashri) fall in love with each other. Rekha's father "Kuppathotti" Govindaswamy (Vadivelu) is a wealthy industrialist who was a beggar in the past while Dilip's mother "Royal" Rajalakshmi (Srividya) is an arrogant woman born with a silver spoon in her mouth. Later, "Kuppathotti" Govindaswamy and "Royal" Rajalakshmi compete for the Royal Recreation Club presidency and "Kuppathotti" Govindaswamy wins the election. "Royal" Rajalakshmi cannot digest the loss. One day, Moses poses as a foreigner and scams "Kuppathotti" Govindaswamy.

"Kuppathotti" Govindaswamy accepts to arrange the marriage of his daughter with Dilip so he meets "Royal" Rajalakshmi in her house and tries to convince her but "Royal" Rajalakshmi humiliates him. Rekha then challenges "Royal" Rajalakshmi: Rekha will marry her son Dilip with her consent. Thereafter, Ramu and Moses are caught by the people they have cheated. "Kuppathotti" Govindaswamy comes to their rescue and saves the two friends from the angry mob.

"Kuppathotti" Govindaswamy gives them a mission: one of them should seduce "Royal" Rajalakshmi's daughter Seetha (Keerthana). Ramu becomes "Royal" Rajalakshmi's car driver. Ramu and Seetha eventually fall in love with each other. The lovers secretly marry with the support of Dilip. "Royal" Rajalakshmi disowns her daughter and humiliates Ramu. Ramu decides to make an honest living so Moses gifts him a taxi and Ramu becomes a taxi driver. Later, Seetha becomes pregnant.

One day, Ramu witnesses the murder of a reporter by "Challenge" Sankaralingam's henchmen and Ramu escapes from them. Later that day, Ramu takes his pregnant wife with him to the hospital and the henchmen attack him. At the hospital, Ramu is in a serious condition while Seetha is about to give birth. "Challenge" Sankaralingam and his henchmen decide to kill Ramu in the hospital but Moses comes to his rescue and saves him. Ramu is back to his feet and Seetha gives birth. "Royal" Rajalakshmi eventually puts her ego aside: she now supports her son's love and accepts Ramu as her son-in-law.

Cast

Production
The film developed in production under the title Minor Moses.

Soundtrack 
The music was composed by Isaivanan.

References

External links 
 

1990s Tamil-language films
1996 comedy films
1996 films
Films directed by V. C. Guhanathan
Indian comedy films
Tamil remakes of Telugu films